Neville Maxwell (1926 – 23 September 2019) was a British journalist and scholar who authored the 1970 book India's China War, which is considered a revisionist analysis of the 1962 Sino-Indian War, putting the blame for it on India. Maxwell has been praised for his objective view on the 1962 Sino-Indian War, but criticised for his pessimistic and often inaccurate views on Indian democracy.

Career
In 1959 he was posted to New Delhi as the South Asia correspondent. In the next eight years, he traveled from Kabul to East Pakistan and Kathmandu to Ceylon, reporting on the end of the Nehru era in India and the post-Nehru developments. During the 1962 Sino-Indian War, Maxwell wrote for The Times from New Delhi and was the only reporter there who did not uncritically accept the official Indian account of events. This eventually led to his "virtual expulsion" from India.

In 1967, Maxwell joined the School of Oriental and African Studies, University of London, as a senior fellow to write his book India's China War. He was with the Institute of Commonwealth Studies at Oxford University when the book was published in 1970.

Regarded as a comprehensive revisionist study, India's China War contradicted the then prevalent understanding of the war as a product of Chinese "betrayal and expansionism", and set out to prove that it was "in fact of India’s making, that it was 'India's China War'". The book drew extensively from India's classified Henderson Brooks–Bhagat Report, an internal operational review of India's military debacle, which Maxwell was able to obtain a copy of. Due to the lack of available information from China, Maxwell had to rely on inferences based on official Chinese statements with regards to China's perceptions. He did not attempt to evaluate the accuracy of these perceptions.

India's China War was widely praised across a diverse range of opinions, including British historian A. J. P. Taylor, Chinese premier Zhou Enlai and US Secretary of State Henry Kissinger. On the other hand, Singaporean leader Lee Kuan Yew considered it "revisionist, pro-China history". In India, the Indian government charged him with breach of the Official Secrets Act, forcing him to stay out of India to avoid arrest until the charges were annulled by Prime Minister Morarji Desai eight years later.

The book may have been instrumental in bridging the gulf between the US and China. According to Maxwell, Kissinger told Zhou Enlai, "Reading that book showed me I could do business with you people." US President Richard Nixon too is said to have read the book and discussed it with Zhou Enlai during his 1972 visit to China. Maxwell's contention that the war was "a frame-up" was "a flash of light everywhere." Zhou is said to have acknowledged to Maxwell, "your book did a service to truth which benefitted China."

View on Indian democracy
In the 1960s, Maxwell incorrectly predicted that India would not remain a democracy for much longer. While serving as the South Asia correspondent of The Times of London, Maxwell authored a series of pessimistic reports filed in February 1967. In the atmosphere leading up to the 4th Lok Sabha elections, he wrote that "The great experiment of developing India within a democratic framework has failed. [Indians will soon vote] in the fourth—and surely last—general election."

Leak of the Henderson Brooks–Bhagat report
On 17 March 2014, Maxwell posted the first part of the Henderson Brooks–Bhagat Report on his website. The report was written by two Indian army officers in 1963 to examine India's defeat in the Sino-Indian War. It has been classified as top secret by the Indian government, but Maxwell acquired a copy and his India's China War contains the gist of the report. After the Indian government refused to release the report for over 50 years, Maxwell decided to make it public.

Reception
Scholars regard Maxwell's India's China War as a revisionist account of the Sino-Indian War. The earliest accounts of the war regarded China as the aggressor that unleashed its forces on an unsuspecting India. Maxwell inverted the blame, by asserting that India was the aggressor and China the victim.

The book received negative reviews in India. Historian Parshotam Mehra commented that "deeply-rooted prejudice" oozed out of its every sentence, with examples such as:

To sustain his narrative, Maxwell cited those facts alone that were convenient and omitted the others. Well-known scholarly analyses such as the Himalayan Battleground or Francis Watson's The Frontiers of China were missing from Maxwell's bibliography, and so too were the writings of men who had first-hand knowledge, such as Sir Olaf Caroe. Notwithstanding these defects, Mehra believed that the book made a contribution as an "alternative point of view to an understanding of the events" that led to the hostilities.

Historian Sarvepalli Gopal, himself a key player in the Sino-Indian dispute as the Head of Indian MEA's historical division, wrote a lengthy rebuttal in The Round Table. He pointed out that the Indian case for its border definition was set out in considerable detail in the Report of the Officials, which Maxwell dismisses with a one-liner and no real analysis.

Historian Srinath Raghavan, Senior Fellow at the Centre for Policy Research, called India's China War a "seminal revisionist account". He argued that Maxwell "overreached" and that he "curiously interpreted Delhi's actions almost as Beijing would have viewed it". Raghavan recommended "post-revisionist" accounts, such as Steven Hoffman's India and the China Crisis.

American political scientist John Garver wrote that Maxwell shaped the orthodox scholarly view, which was also reached by American scholar Allen Whiting, regarding China's perception of and response to India's Forward Policy: "in deciding for war, China's leaders were responding to an Indian policy of establishing Indian military outposts in territory claimed by both India and China but already under effective Chinese military occupation." Garver pointed out that Maxwell did not have access to Chinese documents or archives which would have given him insights into their policy making process.

Publications

Books

Selected articles

References

Bibliography

External links
 
 China, India, and the fruits of Nehru's folly Interview with Neville Maxwell by Venkatesan Vembu, Daily News & Analysis, 6 June 2007
 My Albatross. With link to the text of the report.

Australian journalists
The Times people
Sino-Indian War
People associated with the School of Advanced Study
McGill University alumni
1926 births
Alumni of the University of Cambridge
2019 deaths
British male journalists